Christine Scheyer (born 18 July 1994) is a World Cup alpine ski racer from Austria. Born in Hohenems, Vorarlberg, she specializes in the speed events of downhill and super-G, and also the combined.  Scheyer made her World Cup debut in December 2014 and achieved her first podium in January 2017, a win in the downhill at Altenmarkt-Zauchensee.

She competed at the 2022 Winter Olympics, and was sixth in the combined.

World Cup results

Season standings

Race podiums
 1 win – (1 DH)
 2 podiums – (2 DH); 13 top tens (8 DH, 5 SG)

World Championship results

Olympic results

References

External links

 
 Christine Scheyer at Austrian Ski team official site 

1994 births
Austrian female alpine skiers
Sportspeople from Bergamo
Living people
Alpine skiers at the 2022 Winter Olympics
Olympic alpine skiers of Austria
People from Hohenems
Sportspeople from Vorarlberg
20th-century Austrian women
21st-century Austrian women